The Turtle Bay Gardens Historic District is a collection of twenty rowhouses in the Turtle Bay neighborhood of Manhattan in New York City. They consist of eleven houses on the south side of 49th Street and nine on the north side of 48th Street, between Second and Third Avenues. The rowhouses, dating from the 1860s, were renovated between 1918 and 1920 by Charlotte Hunnewell Sorchan to plans by Clarence Dean.

The New York City Landmarks Preservation Commission designated the Turtle Bay Gardens Historic District in 1966, and it was listed on the National Register of Historic Places in 1983.

Design 
Dean refaced the brownstone street-fronts with pale stucco. None of the houses are exactly alike, but the street facades are generally four stories high, and some houses have rear attics. The stoops in front of each house were removed; the basements were converted into English basements, slightly below ground level, with rusticated facades. On the street facades, Dean used decorative elements such as balconies made of cast iron, cartouches, parapets, pilasters, quoins, roundels, and stucco detailing. Inside each house, Dean rearranged the interiors so that service room, such as dining rooms faced the noisy street and living areas faced inward. The rear facades are more plainly decorated, and many of the structures contain roof terraces. The rowhouses' secluded character was emphasized by the presence of tall apartments to the east, along Second Avenue, and office buildings to the west, along Third Avenue.

The individual backyards are arranged so that each opens into a common garden of trees and shrubs down the center. The shared space is separated from each individual backyard by short walls made of masonry. Running through the center of the garden is a walkway paved in flagstone, There is also a fountain, designed in the style of another at the Villa Medici, which is surrounded by iron benches and shaded by a willow tree.

Residents 
Sorchan, who was married to Walton Martin, sold the houses to friends at cost, with property restrictions that kept the commons secure. Among the first purchasers was Maria Bowen Chapin, founder of the Chapin School. Celebrity residents since have included actors Katharine Hepburn, Ruth Gordon, June Havoc, Ricardo Montalban, and Tyrone Power; writer-director Garson Kanin; jurist Learned Hand; conductor Leopold Stokowski; editor Maxwell Perkins; publisher Henry Luce; journalist Dorothy Thompson; and writer/journalist E. B. White, who wrote Charlotte's Web when living on 48th Street. Later occupants also included composer Stephen Sondheim and actress Mary-Kate Olsen.

See also 
 List of New York City Designated Landmarks in Manhattan from 14th to 59th Streets
 National Register of Historic Places listings in Manhattan from 14th to 59th Streets

References 

Turtle Bay, Manhattan
Historic districts in Manhattan
New York City Designated Landmarks in Manhattan
New York City designated historic districts
Historic districts on the National Register of Historic Places in Manhattan